John Carrère may refer to:

 John Merven Carrère (1858–1911), American architect
 John Carrère (politician) (died 1948), Canadian politician